The Ancient Order of Hibernians Hall, also known as Hibernian Hall, was a historic building in Anaconda, Montana, United States, that is listed on the National Register of Historic Places.

Description 
The hall is located at 321-323 East Commercial Avenue, within the Anaconda Commercial Historic District. It was built during 1896–1899, at cost of $30,000. The  two-story  by  building includes elements of Queen Anne style architecture in the United States and Romanesque architecture. The lodge room on the second floor was accessed by an entrance on Cedar Street. It cost $30,000 to build and was opened with a grand ball on February 9, 1899. The Anaconda Standard proclaimed it to have the "'finest and largest dance hall in the state'" and for it to be "'one of the handsomest buildings in the City of Anaconda'" with its new floor asserted to be a "'marvel of beauty and artistic workmanship'".

It was listed on the National Register of Historic Places in 1979 but was demolished in 1984 to make way for a parking lot for the adjacent Family Dollar store. The current AOH hall is physically located at 229 East Commercial Avenue, but continues to use its former mailing address.

See also

 National Register of Historic Places listings in Deer Lodge County, Montana
 List of Hibernian buildings
 Elks Building (Anaconda, Montana), another fraternal hall in Anaconda

References

External links

Clubhouses on the National Register of Historic Places in Montana
Queen Anne architecture in Montana
Cultural infrastructure completed in 1899
European American culture in Montana
Hibernian buildings
Romanesque Revival architecture in Montana
1899 establishments in Montana
National Register of Historic Places in Deer Lodge County, Montana
Catholic Church in Montana
Anaconda, Montana